Khorasan (also transcribed as Khurasan and Khorassan), also called Traxiane during Hellenistic and Parthian times, was a province in northeastern Iran but historically referred to a much larger area, comprising the east and the northeast of the Persian Empire. The name Khorāsān is Persian and means "where the sun arrives from". The name was first given to the eastern province of Persia during the Sasanian Empire and was used from the late middle ages in distinction to neighbouring Transoxiana.

This province, whose people are mainly Shia Muslims, roughly encompassed the western half of the historical Greater Khorasan. The modern boundaries of the Iranian province of Khorasan were formally defined in the late nineteenth century and the province was divided into three separate administrative divisions in 2004.

History
The name Khorāsān (lit. "sunrise"; "east"; or "land of the rising sun") was originally given to the eastern province of Persia during the Sassanian period. The old Iranian province of Khorasan roughly formed the western half of the historical Greater Khorasan, a region which included parts that are today in Iran, Afghanistan, Tajikistan, Turkmenistan and Uzbekistan. Some of the main historical cities of Persia are located in the older Khorasan: Nishapur and Tus (now in Iran); Merv and Sanjan (now in Turkmenistan); Samarkand and Bukhara (both now in Uzbekistan); Herat and Balkh (now in Afghanistan); and Khujand and Panjakent (now in Tajikistan). The term was also used from the late middle ages–especially in post-Mongol (Chagatai and Timurid) times–to distinguish the region from neighbouring Transoxiana. The modern Iranian boundaries of the province of Khorasan were defined and formalised in the late nineteenth century.

In August 1968 and September 1978, the region was the scene of two major earthquakes that left 12,000 and 25,000 people dead, respectively. A third major earthquake, the 1997 Qayen earthquake, took place on 10 May 1997 and left 1,567 dead, 2,300 injured, and 50,000 homeless.

Modern divisions
Khorasan was the largest province of Iran until it was divided into three separate provinces in September 2004:

North Khorasan, center: Bojnourd, other counties: Shirvan, Esfarayen, Garmeh and Jajarm, and Maneh and Samalgan
South Khorasan, center: Birjand, other counties: Ferdows, Qaen, Nehbandan, Sarayan, Sarbisheh and Darmian.
Razavi Khorasan, center: Mashhad, other counties: Sabzevar, Neyshabour,  Torbat-e-Heydariyeh, Quchan, Torbat-e Jam, Kashmar, Taybad, Gonabad, Dargaz, Sarakhs, Chenaran, Fariman, Khaf, Roshtkhar, Bardaskan, Kalat and Khalilabad.

Some parts of the province were added to
 some southern parts to Sistan and Baluchestan Province
 some western parts to Yazd Province

Demographics
The major ethnic groups in this region are Persians with  Kurdish, Khorasani Turks and Turkmen as the minorities. Most of the people in the region natively speak closely related modern day dialects of Persian. The region is home to a significant Sunni Muslim minority.
The largest cluster of settlements and cultivation stretches around the city of Mashhad northwestward, containing the important towns of Quchan, Shirvan, and Bojnurd.

See also
Provinces of Iran
Transoxiana
Khwarezm
Afsharid dynasty
 Delhi Multan Road to Mashhad capital of Khorasan province of Iran, providing access to capital city Ashgabat of Turkmenistan.

References

Former provinces of Iran
Khorasan